Lužane is a village in the municipality of Aleksinac, Serbia. According to the 2002 census, the village has a population of 942 people.

Education 
Lužane has only one elementary school called "Vuk Karadžić". It provides education from 1st to 4th grade, and preschool. After 4th grade, kids then go to a school in Žitkovac.

References

Populated places in Nišava District